Ahmed Alam (born 16 February 1972 in Karachi) was a field hockey player and Former Hockey captain & Goalkeeper of Pakistan National Hockey Team, and captain of the Pakistan Hockey team in the 2000 Summer Olympics.

References

nation.com.pk

External links

 

Pakistani male field hockey players
Male field hockey goalkeepers
1972 births
Living people
Olympic field hockey players of Pakistan
Field hockey players at the 2000 Summer Olympics
Field hockey players at the 2004 Summer Olympics
1998 Men's Hockey World Cup players
2002 Men's Hockey World Cup players
Asian Games medalists in field hockey
Field hockey players at the 1994 Asian Games
Field hockey players at the 1998 Asian Games
Field hockey players at the 2002 Asian Games
Commonwealth Games medallists in field hockey
Commonwealth Games bronze medallists for Pakistan
Asian Games bronze medalists for Pakistan
Medalists at the 1994 Asian Games
Medalists at the 1998 Asian Games
Field hockey players at the 2002 Commonwealth Games
Medallists at the 2002 Commonwealth Games